Patrick Kennedy (3 September 1942 – 3 May 1999) was a Northern Irish politician.

Kennedy joined the Republican Labour Party (RLP) and was elected to Belfast City Council in 1967. He became involved in the civil rights protests and was a founder member of the Northern Ireland Civil Rights Association, and joined the Central Citizens Defence Committee. In the 1969 Northern Ireland general election, Kennedy was elected for Belfast Central. 

In August 1969, during intensive rioting in his constituency, he tried, without success, to get the Royal Ulster Constabulary to withdraw the armoured cars and heavy machine guns they were using against the rioters. After the rioting, in which Catholic residents of mixed areas in Belfast were burned out, Defence Committees were formed to defend nationalist areas. In September 1969, Kennedy was the Falls Road Citizens Defence Committee's delegate in talks with James Callaghan. 

In 1970, RLP leader Gerry Fitt left to help establish the Social Democratic and Labour Party. Kennedy was elected as the new leader of the RLP. The following year, he held a press conference in Belfast where he introduced Joe Cahill, a leading figure in the Provisional IRA, intending that this would show the ineffectiveness of internment. While successful as a media event, appearing with the IRA led many constitutional nationalist politicians to refuse to work with him. 

In 1971, he withdrew from Stormont, which was suspended the following year. He stood unsuccessfully in Belfast West as a candidate for the Northern Ireland Assembly in 1973. As both he and Harry Diamond, the other RLP candidate, were defeated, it was decided to wind up the party. In the late 1970s, Kennedy moved to Dublin, where he trained as a barrister before becoming a planning consultant.

Death
Kennedy died at age 56 in 1999 from cancer. He was survived by his wife and five children.

References

Sources

1942 births
1999 deaths
Leaders of political parties in Northern Ireland
Members of the House of Commons of Northern Ireland 1969–1973
Politicians from Belfast
Republican Labour Party members of the House of Commons of Northern Ireland
Deaths from cancer in the Republic of Ireland
Members of the House of Commons of Northern Ireland for Belfast constituencies